Peyman Fattahi (born 1973), also known as Master Elias M. Ramollah, is the founder and leader of the El Yasin Community. Born in Kermanshah, Iran, he began his public teachings at the age of 23. His teachings cover a wide range of topics, including spirituality, thought, thinking methods, parapsychology, metaphysics and esoteric knowledge. He teaches concepts such as "Systematic Decision Making using 7/10 Method" and "poly-what planning formulae". 

Fattahi has insisted repeatedly that he is not a religious man, although a large proportion of his teachings are focused on reviving divine spiritualism, esoteric cognition, and self-awareness. He has little academic education; but has written more than 4000 pages in the field of esoteric knowledge and applied and fundamental theories. He has also supervised and directed more than 200 research projects and the content of his public speeches has been collected to form more than 39 books. Fattahi ascribes his knowledge to his observations, thoughts and personal attributes.

Although his teachings on the field of thinking methods have been most popular within the past 15 years, some of his followers still know him as a spiritual leader. Fattahi presents himself as a servant of God and frequently refers to himself as an ordinary person. He attributes all extraordinary phenomena to the Spirit of God who he considers to be his patron and guide.

Fattahi expresses the essence of his teachings in his statement, "There is no deity but God" (La Elaha Ella Hou), and he considers teaching and realization of this statement as being his vocation. He stresses the union and reconciliation of religions, nations and various trends. He talks about the necessity and realization of a global revolution to prepare the world and be ready for "the Divine Manifestation and a great evolution."

Teachings
Fattahi claims that he began his teachings at the age of 16 among a limited number of students. At the age of 23, he began public speeches. Fattahi's supporters claim that he has proposed a large number of doctrines and fundamental theories in the past 20 years.

Fattahi's teachings are based on "Elahism". Another name given to his teachings is "The Art of Transcendental Life", which has two levels. The first level consists of simple, general instructions and is called the "Solar Level" or the stage of "Revival and Rebirth". The essence of his instructions in this level is a perception of divine presence and revelation of love for The Lord or "living lovingly in the divine presence", based upon certain principles.

The second level is called the "Astronomical Level", "ZX methods", or "Psychotechnology", which includes "creative dreaming", "spiritual communication", "teletransportation", "energy hunting" and "parallel experiencing". Fattahi does not give this training to the public, but to a selected group of his followers, who commit to strict rules such as anonymity, secretiveness, avoiding the use of their abilities for personal means and complying with some unusual conditions.
 
Elia does not charge the attendees for his teachings; instead, the student's self is the price of their training.

Other public teachings
In addition to spiritual and cognitive teachings, Fattahi has held tutorials for a limited number of his students during which they have been trained in more specialized fields. Fattahi teaches what he calls "XZY" or "36 Methods of Sublime Thinking", which discuss methods to think and make decisions.

Criticism 
Fattahi was first mentioned by Kayhan newspaper (the organ of the Islamic Republic of Iran) as a perverted character in 2004. His name was published again in Kayhan and Resalat newspapers a few months before his first detention in 2007 by the Security service of Iran.

Some critics have accused Fattahi of heresy and claiming prophecy, and categorize his teachings as a new religious movement (NRM). Others, however, consider him as the leader of a subversive sect, related to global Zionism networks and the Masons, and a mesmerizer, wizard, neo-Rasputin and Kabbala promoter.

In 2010, the newspaper Jomhouri Eslami published the article "A God who is the 13th child of his family" in which Fattahi was introduced as a person claiming to be a deity.

The 6th branch of the Special Court for Governmental Staffs was authorized to open a special case against him in 2006 and recalled the possible plaintiffs through a public announcement by Kayhan to lodge their complaints. The case was closed without any specific result due to lack of plaintiffs.

Detentions

First detention
Fattahi was first detained on 27 May 2007 under the authority of the Office of Religions and Sects (اداره ادیان و فرق) in the Ministry of Intelligence and National Security of Iran. Among the charges brought against him were religious innovation, promoting religious pluralism and apostasy, conspiracy against the Islamic regime, and acting against national security. A number of his close associates and followers were also arrested, including two of his brothers, Keyvan and Ramin Fattahi. Ramin Fattahi was confined for 45 days before being released, after which he died due to kidney dysfunction. Fattahi wrote a letter to the Supreme Leader of Iran Ali Khamenei in which he described being tortured. This letter caused Fattahi to be summoned and assaulted and beaten by his interrogators, and eventually led to his hospitalization.

In November 2007, Fattahi was released on a bail of 300 million Tomans (almost 300,000 USD) after spending six months in prison, suffering from recurrent bleeding from the nose and ears, bloody vomiting and bloody urination.

Second detention
In mid-January 2009, Fattahi was detained for the second time along with five of his close students and placed in solitary confinement in the political 209 ward of Evin Prison.

Third detention
On 24 July 2011, a report was published about Fattahi's third detention along with a number of his students and members of the Association of Thinkers and Researchers. A few days later, the official spokesperson of the Elyasin Community, who resides in the UK, verified this but said that everyone had been released shortly after detention and no one was under arrest, which was confirmed by other members. Immediately after publication of this announcement, Tabnak and some government-related blogs and websites published a short note giving the government's version of Fattahi's arrest.

Written works and confiscated books
More than 30 of Fattahi's books have been confiscated by Ministry of Intelligence and National Security of Iran.

References

External links

 http://ayahra.org/en
 http://safireaseman.com
 http://aleyassin.blogspot.com/

Iranian reformists
Living people
1973 births
Prisoners and detainees of Iran
Iranian prisoners and detainees
Iranian scholars